Kneževo may refer to:

 Kneževo, Bosnia and Herzegovina, a town and municipality in Bosnia and Herzegovina
 Kneževo (Brus), a village in Serbia
 Kneževo, Croatia, a village near Popovac, Croatia
 Kneževo, North Macedonia, a village near Kratovo, North Macedonia